Wang Peng (born 24 January 1993 in Fushun) is a Chinese professional footballer who currently plays as a midfielder for Chinese Super League club Shenzhen FC.

Club career
Wang Peng started his professional football career in 2012 when he joined Beijing Sangao for the 2012 China League Two campaign. He moved to China League One club Shijiazhuang Ever Bright in January 2014. He would be part of the squad that would gain promotion to the top tier at the end of the 2014 China League One campaign. On 5 April 2015, he made his Super League debut in a 2–1 defeat against Jiangsu Sainty, coming on as a substitute for Hu Wei in the 82nd minute. On 30 October 2016, Wang was suspended for half-year by China Anti-Doping Agency due to a positive sample test for hydrochlorothiazide. This would hurt the club as they were relegated at the end of the 2016 Chinese Super League campaign. On 10 March 2018, Wang scored his first goal for the club in a 2–1 home win over Meizhou Hakka. He scored four goals in 28 appearances in the 2018 season.

On 10 February 2019, Wang transferred to Super League newcomer Shenzhen. He would go on to make his debut for Shenzhen in a league game against Hebei China Fortune F.C. on the 2 March 2019 in a 3-1 victory. Despite going on to make 24 league appearances, the club only survived relegation because Tianjin Tianhai F.C. dissolved. On 20 January 2020, Wang would be loaned back to Shijiazhuang Ever Bright for the 2020 Chinese Super League campaign. He would make his return debut in a league game on 26 July 2020 against Hebei China Fortune F.C. where he also scored in a 2-2 draw.

Career statistics 
Statistics accurate as of match played 18 October 2021.

References

External links
 

1993 births
Living people
Chinese footballers
People from Fushun
Footballers from Liaoning
Cangzhou Mighty Lions F.C. players
Shenzhen F.C. players
Chinese Super League players
China League One players
China League Two players
Association football midfielders
Chinese sportspeople in doping cases
21st-century Chinese people